Laser Radial World Championships may refer to:
Men's Laser Radial World Championships
Women's Laser Radial World Championships